Gao Xiang (born October 1963) is a Chinese historian and politician, currently serving as Chinese Communist Party Committee Secretary and president of the Chinese Academy of Social Sciences and president of the Chinese Academy of History.

He was a representative of the 19th National Congress of the Chinese Communist Party. He is a representative of the 20th National Congress of the Chinese Communist Party and a member of the 20th Central Committee of the Chinese Communist Party.

Biography
Gao was born in Nanbu County, Sichuan, in October 1963, and graduated from the Renmin University of China. He joined the Chinese Communist Party (CCP) in October 1994. He taught at the Renmin University of China before being assigned to the Chinese Academy of Social Sciences in November 1996. In July 2012, he became deputy secretary-general, rising to secretary-general the next year.

In March 2016, he was appointed head of Publicity Department of the CCP Fujian Provincial Committee and was admitted to member of the Standing Committee of the CCP Fujian Provincial Committee, the province's top authority. He also served as chairman of the Fujian Federation of Social Sciences.

He was appointed deputy director of the Office of the Central Network Security and Informatization Commission in December 2017, concurrently serving as deputy director of the State Internet Information Office.

In November 2018, he was recalled to the Chinese Academy of Social Sciences (CASS) as vice president, in addition to serving as president of the Chinese Academy of History since January 2019. He was appointed CCP committee secretary and president of CASS in late 2022.

Publications

References

1963 births
Living people
People from Yanting County
Renmin University of China alumni
Academic staff of Renmin University of China
Chinese historians
People's Republic of China politicians from Sichuan
Chinese Communist Party politicians from Sichuan
Members of the 20th Central Committee of the Chinese Communist Party